La Révolution française is a two-part 1989 historical film co-produced by France, Germany, Italy, the United Kingdom and Canada for the 200th anniversary of the French Revolution. The full film runs at 360 minutes, but the edited-for-television version is slightly longer. It purports to tell a faithful and neutral story of the Revolution, from the calling of the Estates-General to the death of Maximilien de Robespierre. The film had a large budget (FRF 300 million) and boasted an international cast. It was shot in French, German and English.

Plot
Part I La Révolution française: les Années lumière (The French Revolution: Years of Hope), directed by Robert Enrico
The first part focuses on the events of the early days of the French Revolution.

The film opens in 1774 with a young Robespierre reading a document in front of a carriage in the College Louis le Grand. He is splashed with mud after a horse's hoof smacks the muddy ground, prompting his classmates to laugh at him. Robespierre's classmate, Desmoulins, comforts and reassures Robespierre. The film jumps 15 years later at the calling of the Estates General of 1789, which proves to be a disaster as many members of the Third Estate had sworn an oath on 20 June 1789 to not stop convening as a committee until they are given more rights. In response, King Louis XVI closes the assembly. In a private lunch following the incident, Marie Antoinette gives Louis a few ideas, such as using force should the people refuse the King's demands. Meanwhile, many orators rouse the people to demand for change. The situation only worsens after King Louis XVI dismisses and banishes finance minister Jacques Necker, a friend and popular figure of the people.

On 14 July 1789, revolutionaries gather at the Bastille prison, seeking weapons and gunpowder for their revolutionary cause. A battle ensues between Revolutionary forces and the prison's garrison, headed by the Marquis de Launay, where the Revolutionaries emerge victorious after a bloody struggle and tense negotiations. Launay is lynched and his head stuck on a pike, the revolutionaries dancing "La Carmagnole" around it in celebration.

Louis XVI arrives at Paris while the Marquis de Lafayette reads the Declaration of the Rights of Man and of the Citizen out to the National Assembly as people from all corners of France read it for themselves or hear it. Soon after, Georges Danton rallies the people to march on Versailles via newspaper. As a result, thousands of women march on Versailles, demanding bread, later being joined by male revolutionaries. The women storm the palace, overpowering the guards but stopping short of the King and Queen, protected by guards and soldiers. After the mob demands that the King appear on the balcony to prove he hasn't left and abandoned the people, Louis XVI appears on the balcony, followed by his wife, Marie Antoinette. As the mob prepares to shoot her, she kneels down, pleading forgiveness, and the mob relents, shouting "God save the Queen!".

Afterward, Louis meets with inventor Joseph-Ignace Guillotin, and is presented with a model of a new execution device he names the Guillotine. At first, Guillotin proposes a crescent-shaped blade, but Louis, who claims he is experienced with mechanics, proposes a triangular blade instead, and designed like a saw, to Guillotin's delight. Meanwhile, Danton starts his own political newspaper. A few days later, a celebration is held at the Champ de Mars, known today as the Fête de la Fédération. Some of those in the masses are Danton, Maximilien Robespierre, and many other revolutionaries. Lafayette and the people swear an oath of faith and loyalty to France. Soon afterwards, a mutiny in the Nancy garrison is quickly put down, many being beaten publicly to death or hanged.

In a speech before the National Assembly, Danton demands the resignation of the Interior Minister, Minister of War, the Monsieur de la Tour du Pin, and many others, to the support and agreement from many delegates present. Soon afterwards, riots against the clergy are incited, and many attacks against clergymen, churches, cathedrals, and monasteries across France being ransacked and looted. Baptism is mocked, and organists are forced to play revolutionary music on the organ. Subsequently, Lafayette signs an edict demanding the arrest of all Revolutionaries in the National Assembly. Meanwhile, the royal family flees Paris, hoping to reach the Austrian Netherlands disguised as servants. However, they are identified by an innkeeper at Varennes, and returned to Paris. Speakers around France demand that Louis XVI be stripped of his royal title as King of France and be reduced to merely "Citizen Louis Capet".

The Mayor of Paris, Jean Sylvain Bailly, is forced to declare martial law after Danton and his supporters gather at the Champ de Mars. Initially dispersed by the National Guard, they return on 17 July 1791, gathering souvenirs, banners and flags. However, the National Guard also returns, and after the soldiers fire a warning shot above the heads of the civilians, the crowd begins to throw stones and other objects at the soldiers. Taking this as a sign of hostility, Bailly orders his troops to open fire, despite Lafayette's efforts to maintain peace between both sides. The resulting massacre is a bloodbath, with dozens dead or wounded. The survivors quickly scatter, and this only worsens the situation.

A few weeks later, Louis XVI and the National Assembly declare war on the great powers of Europe, but Robespierre knows that the campaign will be a disaster, and his prediction initially proves to be true. French troops march on the Belgian frontier, but are quickly annihilated by forces of Prussia and Austria, and a French general is killed by his own soldiers. Jean-Paul Marat demands that "ten thousand heads must fall here in France." The Duke of Brunswick issues a manifesto demanding that France surrender, or he will "burn Paris to the ground." Another call to action is given at the National Assembly, with Robespierre again certain that the next campaign will be a disaster. While French soldiers make their way to the front, they are given provisions in the towns they enter, and sing a new song: "La Marseillaise".

On 10 August, thousands of Revolutionaries surround the Tuileries Palace. Initially, the National Guard are ordered to defend the palace, but unwilling to fire upon their fellow brethren, they switch sides and point cannons at the palace. An armed standoff takes place, where Louis XVI, Marie Antoinette, and the rest of the nobility are escorted out of the Palace for refuge in the meeting place of the National Assembly, where the children watch the proceedings. Back at the Tuileries, the insurrectionists break through the Palace gates, and an intense firefight ensues between the Swiss Guards and the revolutionaries. Despite the Swiss Guards' best efforts, and heavy losses sustained by the Revolutionaries, the Palace is taken. Louis then tells his son that "there is no longer a King in France".

Part II La Révolution française: les Années terribles (The French Revolution: Years of Rage), directed by Richard T. Heffron
The second part focuses on the aftermath of the 10 August Insurrection and the Reign of Terror.

On 13 August, Louis XVI and his family arrive at the Temple, a fortress and prison, where they would remain as prisoners until their sentence. With the King deposed and Danton serving as Justice Minister, Camille Desmoulins believes that everything they have done in the Revolution is over and they can finally rest, but Robespierre overrules this by pointing out it could only be the beginning. Lafayette then is forced to step down from his position as commander of the Army of the North and is later taken prisoner by the Allies. As Prussian forces advance closer to Paris, desperate measures are taken by Danton and his associates. Death warrants are issued, with many thronging the steps pleading for Danton to spare a relative, or a friend. Meanwhile, Prussian troops ransack cities and continue to annihilate the French armies in the field. The September Massacres slaughter thousands of nobles and anyone suspected of loyalty to the monarchy. Not even Marie Antoinette's lady-in-waiting, the Princesse de Lamballe, is spared, and her head is shown to Marie Antoinette, who collapses on the floor, sobbing. On 20 September, French forces fight and emerge victorious over the Prussians at the Battle of Valmy, and celebrations ring out throughout France and the National Assembly.

Louis XVI is brought before the National Assembly after Louis Antoine de Saint-Just demands his execution. Louis denies the charges brought against him, and when the topic of the Swiss Guards is brought up, Louis responds that he doubled the guards for his own safety, then denying that he caused the bloodshed on August 10 and that there were no armories in the Tuileries at the time. The next day, Louis declares before the assembly that his conscience is clear, and that the worse thing that wounded his heart were the accusations that he had shed the blood of the people. Later that night, the court votes to execute Louis. On 2 January, Louis is brought to the scaffold in a closed carriage. He attempts to make a speech to the crowd, but is drowned out mid-speech by drums ordered to sound by the commander. Louis is then beheaded by the guillotine to cheers from the previously-silent crowd. Shortly afterwards, his own son, Louis Charles, is taken by soldiers to be tutored by a man named Citizen Simon, much to the dismay of Marie Antoinette.

Robespierre confers with Danton and considers a new Revolutionary Tribunal, despite them being branded as dictators. Marat is brought before the tribunal and acquitted, as Danton knew he would be. However, Danton drives out the Girondins from his office, including Brissot. In another conference with Robespierre, Danton announces that he wants Brissot executed. Armed citizens surround the Convention and drive out Brissot and his supporters. Soon after, a young woman named Charlotte Corday hears a speech criticizing and denouncing Marat, and decides to act. She manages to get into Marat's room and stabs Marat whilst he is writing for a newspaper in his bathtub, killing him instantly. During Marat's funeral, Robespierre proposes new granaries for the starving populace to resounding support (Corday is afterward executed offscreen).

On 15 October 1793, Marie Antoinette is escorted by her guards to the Revolutionary Tribunal for her trial. She is asked by the court on who provided the carriage for their flight to Varennes, where she replies with Count Alex von Fersen. Jacques Hébert then testifies before the court that whilst he was interrogating Citizen Simon, the latter had said he had seen the boy do "indecent and harmful acts", and then questioned him on who had taught him these things, to the young Capet admitting it was his mother and aunt, also admitting he had been forced to sleep with both of them, and that they "committed acts of debauchery", to which Marie Antoinette responds with an emotional appeal to all mothers in the room, crying out that "Nature itself reels from such an accusation". Antoinette is then convicted and condemned to death, and is executed the next day on October 16. Marie maintains great dignity and courage during her execution.

Saint-Just makes a speech before the Convention and declares that "Terror is the order of the day." The next day, Saint-Just and Robespierre witness the execution of Brissot and his supporters. Danton is remarried (after the death of his old wife a few months earlier). Danton later gives a speech in front of the Convention, calling it a "den of faction, lies, and insanity", seeing churches desecrated outside, and asks, "is this the Republic we wanted to create?" He then demands that a "Committee of Clemency" be established, and receives support and applause from many in the audience and in the Convention, even from Robespierre himself, to the surprise of those near him. Hébert has great concern for the possible comeback of Danton, and expresses his need to "use every weapon against him". Hébert then denounces Danton via newspaper, and later to a crowd, accusing him of treason and having betrayed the Revolution. Robespierre then appears and asks for a Committee to investigate Danton's career and integrity, and declares the accusations false and fraudulent, saving Danton's life in the process. Hébert then incites his followers to insurrection. The Committee of Public Safety then unanimously votes for the arrest of Hébert, and he is arrested (later executed, also offscreen).

The Committee of Public Safety debates on Danton's situation, and decide on his immediate arrest. Danton later tells one of his associates that even if there were a trial, he would win. Danton and Camille are both arrested. Danton's trial is chaotic, with the stands and seats full of his supporters, as well as the jury being hand-picked to ensure he is convicted. At a local play, Robespierre is discovered by the actors and the audience quickly shouts for his downfall. Saint-Just finds a letter uncovering a conspiracy between Desmoulins' wife Lucile with some aristocrats to free Camille and Danton. The Committee decides to present it as a testimony of Desmoulins and Danton's treachery, and Camille's wife is arrested. The next day, the evidence is presented, and Danton and his supporters are condemned to death and executed. As they are led out of the courtroom, the audience, who is supportive of Danton, sings La Marseillaise. Desmoulins' wife is also executed a few days later.

Robespierre holds the Festival of the Supreme Being on 8 June 1794. Initially, the festival is triumphant and majestic, but it proves to be a disaster. Robespierre speaks for so long that some in the crowd start sleeping. Some even murmur that Robespierre thinks he's either the Pope or God Himself. When Robespierre declares that the Supreme Being's religion is Virtue, someone in the crowd yells that Robespierre's is Murder. As Robespierre's speech goes on, the crowd starts to be more aggressive to him and many begin to leave, either discontented with the contents of Robespierre's speech or simply bored of the entire thing. The Committee starts denouncing Robespierre, saying that he has "executed more people in the last two months than in the last two years", although he is defended by ardent supporters such as Saint-Just. The Committee decides that things have gone too far and plot to bring an end to Robespierre. At the Convention, Robespierre makes a speech detailing his situation, from his perspective, to his hearers, whilst his political enemies decide to stop him in his tracks on that day. Robespierre's opponents then demand that he read out the names of those he accused as Robespierre finishes his speech. When Robespierre refuses, the Convention denounces him a tyrant and unanimously votes for his execution.

Robespierre and his supporters take refuge in the Hôtel de Ville, Paris and organize a defense of the building. The Convention musters a large force, commanded by a drunken general, to storm the building and take Robespierre prisoner, whilst Robespierre's followers barricade themselves in the building. A cannon brings down the barricaded door, and a brief skirmish ensues between forces of the National Guard and Robespierre. The doors to the main room are broken down and a large scuffle ensues, with Robespierre himself accidentally shooting himself in the jaw after being tackled to the floor, following an attempt to shoot a soldier targeting him. Robespierre and his supporters are all arrested and await execution. The next day, Robespierre, Saint-Just, and other prominent Robespierrists are taken to the Place de la Révolution and guillotined, effectively marking the end of the Reign of Terror. In the closing scene, family members of some of the leading revolutionaries light candles in a church, before leaving.

Cast

Production
Production took three years, and cost around USD$50 million with the extensive support of the French government, making it the most expensive French film at the time.

Reception

The film is generally considered by historians as historically accurate. Among the few departures from the historical facts, executioner Charles-Henri Sanson was shown executing both Louis XVI and Marie-Antoinette. The elder Sanson actually executed only Louis XVI; it was his son who executed Marie-Antoinette, however Charles-Henri Sanson did attend the execution.

Some critics pointed, however, that it suffered from its neutrality, which resulted in a lack of point of view and some incoherence. The first part, which dealt with a complex historical subject, was also criticized for disjointed pacing. The second part was considered by audiences and critics more gripping and dramatic. Balmer received great praise from critics and audiences for his portrayal of a rather sympathetic Louis XVI, and Seweryn was considered very convincing as Robespierre.

Despite critical success, the film was not commercially successful in France.

See also
List of longest films

References

External links

1989 films
Films set in 1774
Films set in 1789
Films set in 1791
Films set in 1793
Films set in 1794
Films about Georges Danton
Films about Maximilien Robespierre
Cultural depictions of Charlotte Corday
Cultural depictions of Georges Danton
Cultural depictions of Gilbert du Motier, Marquis de Lafayette
Cultural depictions of Jean-Paul Marat
Cultural depictions of Louis XVI
Cultural depictions of Marie Antoinette
Cultural depictions of Maximilien Robespierre
English-language French films
English-language German films
English-language Italian films
1980s French-language films
1980s German-language films
French Revolution films
Films directed by Richard T. Heffron
Films directed by Robert Enrico
Films released in separate parts
Films scored by Georges Delerue
French drama films
German drama films
Italian drama films
British drama films
Canadian drama films
1980s Canadian films
1980s British films
1980s Italian films
1980s French films
1980s German films